The Embassy of Austria to Moldova is located in Chișinău.

See also 
 Austria–Moldova relations

References

External links 
  Austria to open an Embassy in Moldova in 2007

Austria
Chisinau
Austria–Moldova relations
Buildings and structures in Chișinău